Yana Daniëls (born 8 May 1992) is a Belgian professional footballer who plays as a striker for Liverpool in the Women's Super League and for the Belgium national team.

Club career

Oud-Heverlee Leuven, 2008–2010
Daniëls started her club career at Oud-Heverlee Leuven, 2008–2010 where she originally scored 7 goals in 46 games.

Sint-Truidense V.V. (women), 2010–2011
Daniëls left OH Leuven and joined Sint-Truidense, scoring 4 times in 12 regular season appearances.

Oud-Heverlee Leuven, 2011–2012
Daniëls returned to OH Leuven for one season where she scored 8 goals in 22 league appearances.

Lierse SK, 2012–2014
Daniëls joined Lierse SK from OH Leuven ahead of the 2012 season.  She went on to score 10 goals in 48 league appearances.

FC Twente, 2014–2015
Daniëls then moved to FC Twenty where she scored seven goals in 18 appearances.  She also got the opportunity to play Champions league football.  She unfortunately suffered a serious injury during the 2015 Cyprus Women's Cup.

RSC Anderlecht, 2015–2017
After recovering from a serious injury sustained at the 2015 Cyprus Women's Cup, Daniëls signed a short-term contract with RSC Anderlecht.  After success she re-signed with the club in December 2016.

Bristol City, 2017–2018
In June 2017, Daniëls joined FA WSL 1 club Bristol City.

Liverpool FC, 2018–2019
In July 2018, Daniëls left Bristol City to join Liverpool.

Bristol City, 2019–2021
A year after leaving, Daniëls re-signed with Bristol City in July 2019.

Liverpool FC, 2021–present 
On 23 June 2021 it was announced that Daniëls re-signed with Liverpool after a two year stint with Bristol City.

International career
Daniëls has represented Belgium at youth level, scoring 4 goals in 9 appearances for Belgium under-17 and scoring 3 goals in 11 appearances for Belgium under-19. She has also represented Belgium's senior team more than 30 times and represented them during the 2017 UEFA Women's Championship.

Honours 
FC Twente
Winner
 KNVB Women's Cup: 2014–15

Runners-up
 BeNe League: 2014–15

Lierse SK
Runners-up
 Belgian Women's Super Cup: 2012–13

References

External links 
 

1992 births
Living people
Belgian women's footballers
Belgium women's international footballers
Belgian expatriate sportspeople in England
Expatriate women's footballers in England
Oud-Heverlee Leuven (women) players
FC Twente (women) players
Bristol City W.F.C. players
Liverpool F.C. Women players
Expatriate women's footballers in the Netherlands
Eredivisie (women) players
Women's Super League players
Women's association football forwards
Super League Vrouwenvoetbal players
RSC Anderlecht (women) players
UEFA Women's Euro 2017 players